A police stop may be:

 a Terry stop, in U.S. law, a brief detention of a person by police
 a traffic stop,  the detention of a driver of a vehicle by police
 Police Stop!, a British television program.